Béla Vihar (23 May 1908 – 24 November 1978), born Béla Weisz, was a Hungarian poet, journalist, writer and teacher. He is known for his book entitled "Yellow Book, Facts of the Wartime Sufferings of Hungarian Jewry" which was the first documentary book about The Holocaust in the world. His famous poem, "A Soldier walking in the snow" (translated by László Tehel) commemorates all the soldiers who lost their lives in war.

Biography and career

Béla Vihar was born on 23 May 1908 in Hajdúnánás. His parents were Samuel and Terez (nee Glucklich) Weisz, who would become Jewish victims of the Holocaust.

Béla married Magda Widder, the daughter of painter Félix Bódog Widder, and their daughter was Judit Vihar.

His poems were published in English, Bulgarian, Czech, French, Hebrew, Croatian, German, Italian, Russian, Romanian, Spanish and Slovak languages. In the 1970s his radio drama "Der Fremde. Hörspiel – Ballade" (The Stranger. Radio Drama – Ballad) was a great success in Germany.

We two, alone:
We are two at the birth.
We are two in love, lonely               
at the time of death

References

Awards and honors
Attila József Prize – 1966

Bibliography

Selected works

Books

Poems
 Út önmagadtól (1933)
 A szerelem születése (1958)
 Baráti asztal (1960)
 Önarckép 1962 (1962)
 A négy felelet (1965)
 Kígyóének (1970)
 Párbeszéd az idővel (1968)
 Küzdelem az angyallal (1973)
 Szamárháton (1976)
 Egy katona megy a hóban (1978)
 Az alkonyat kapujában (1980)
 Elröppent lakodalom (1984)
 Szíjak között (ed. Judit Vihar). Széphalom Könyvműhely, Budapest. 1998. (Disclosed: Among Phylacteries)

External links 

 

1908 births
Writers from Budapest
Hungarian journalists
1978 deaths
Hungarian male poets
Attila József Prize recipients
20th-century Hungarian poets
20th-century Hungarian male writers
20th-century journalists
People from Hajdúnánás